Oudendijk is a hamlet in the Dutch province of South Holland. It is a part of the municipality of Hoeksche Waard, and lies about 9 km southwest of Spijkenisse.

Oudendijk is not a statistical entity, and considered part of Klaaswaal. It has no place name signs, and consists of about 60 houses.

References

Populated places in South Holland
Hoeksche Waard